Valeria is a pirate and adventuress (a member of The Red Brotherhood of pirates) in the fictional universe of Robert E. Howard's Conan the Barbarian stories.  She appears in Robert E. Howard's Conan novella "Red Nails", serialized in Weird Tales 28 1-3 (July, August/September & October 1936). This was the last Conan story written by Howard, and published posthumously.  The name was also used for Conan's love interest in the 1982 film Conan the Barbarian.

Description
Robert E. Howard described Valeria in "Red Nails" as follows:

She is also described as a superior swordswoman.  Valeria is faster and more agile than Conan.

Reception

The character is a powerful, active figure, but is also sometimes rendered helpless for the titillation of the reader. As Winter Elliott writes, Valeria "represents a mediation between the possibilities of female agency and her own gendered identity. As Conan points out, Valeria can't escape the simple fact of her femininity. As such, her identity is structured by her society. Like Conan, Valeria's pursuit of freedom against her society's wishes marginalizes her, making her other, but it also forces Howard to go to extravagant lengths to substantiate her femininity, which he does by including not one, but two female bondage scenes. If she can be subjected to such sexual humiliation, Howard implies, she must be female... What happens to Valeria is more about the needs of the reading/viewing audience than her own action or inaction. Valeria in those sexually debased moments isn't a character in and of herself, but rather a narrative tool designed to provoke a response from the readers."

In other media 
Valeria had a major role in the 1982 film Conan the Barbarian, where she was played by Sandahl Bergman,  although the character portrayed in the film differed from Howard's character, having a romantic relationship with Conan and borrowing characteristics from Bêlit, another character by Howard. Valeria is killed during the course of the film, but assists Conan in spirit form.
Valeria appeared as an ally of the player in the 2008 MMO Age of Conan and began to rule Tortage after the fall of the tyrant Strom.

References

Further reading
 "Conan the Blueprint: The Construction of Masculine Prototypes in Genre Films" by Guido Ipsen, in The Handbook of Gender, Sex, and Media (Wiley, 2011), pp. 135–156.

Conan the Barbarian characters
Fantasy film characters
Literary characters introduced in 1936
Fictional female pirates
Fictional swordfighters
Fictional women soldiers and warriors
Robert E. Howard characters
Female characters in literature